Jiloca may refer to:
Jiloca River, a river in Spain
Jiloca Comarca, a comarca in Aragon, Spain 
Ribera del Jiloca, a Spanish geographical indication for Vino de la Tierra wines located in the wine-producing area of the Jiloca Valley